Richard Phelips (by 1488 – 1558), of Poole and Charborough, Dorset, Southwark, Surrey and London, was an English politician.

He was a Member of Parliament (MP) for Poole in 1512 and 1515, Melcombe Regis in 1529, Wareham in March 1553 and Dorset in 1554.

References

15th-century births
1558 deaths
People from Poole
People from Southwark
Politicians from London
English MPs 1515
English MPs 1512–1514
English MPs 1529–1536
English MPs 1553 (Edward VI)
English MPs 1554–1555